Humberto Romero Martínez (born 11 October 1964) is a retired Mexican footballer and manager. Currently, Romero is the head coach of the Tercera División club Camaroneros de Escuinapa.

Club career
Romero started his professional career with Leones Negros UdeG from his hometown Guadalajara in 1982. He would spend a total of 12 seasons playing for UdeG as a defender.

For the 1994–95 season, Romero was transferred to Toros Neza. He was part of the team that were runners-up to Guadalajara in the Verano 1997 tournament.

During his career, he was called once to the Mexico national football team for a friendly match against El Salvador on 13 January 1987.

Managerial career
Currently, Romero is the head coach of Camaroneros de Escuinapa, a club from the Mexican Third Division, from Escuinapa, Sinaloa.

References

1964 births
Living people
Footballers from Guadalajara, Jalisco
Mexican football managers
Liga MX players
Mexican footballers
Mexico international footballers
Association football defenders
Leones Negros UdeG footballers
Toros Neza footballers